The McMillan Formation is a geologic formation in Ohio, Kentucky and Indiana. It preserves fossils dating back to the Ordovician period.

See also

 List of fossiliferous stratigraphic units in Ohio

References
 

Specific

Ordovician Kentucky
Ordovician Indiana
Ordovician Ohio
Ordovician southern paleotemperate deposits
Katian